Simon Muriithi Wachira (born 6 May 1984) is a Kenyan race walker. He competed in the men's 20 kilometres walk at the 2016 Summer Olympics.

References

1984 births
Living people
Kenyan male racewalkers
Olympic athletes of Kenya
Athletes (track and field) at the 2016 Summer Olympics
Athletes (track and field) at the 2018 Commonwealth Games
Place of birth missing (living people)
Athletes (track and field) at the 2019 African Games
Commonwealth Games competitors for Kenya
African Games competitors for Kenya
21st-century Kenyan people